This is a list of Canadian soccer players, who have played abroad in leagues other than in Canada or the United States.

Australia 

 Shondell Busby - Valentine FC - 2012
 Ryan Fante - Valentine FC - 2012
 Adrian Butters - Valentine FC - 2012
 Sherwin Emmanuel - Adelaide Raiders SC 
 Nate Foster - Dandenong Thunder SC

Brazil 

 Emilio Reuben - Flamengo - 1941
 Tony Menezes - 
 Charles Gbeke - 
 Kevin de Serpa -

Bulgaria 

 Milan Borjan - PFC Ludogorets Razgrad - 2014, 2015–17

China 

 Mason Trafford - Guizhou Zhicheng - 2013

Colombia 

 Nicolas Galvis - Deportivo Pereira - 2017-

Costa Rica 

 Keven Alemán - C.S. Herediano, Belén F.C., Deportivo Saprissa - 2014-16, 2015–16, 2017-

Cyprus 

 Issey Nakajima-Farran - AEK Larnaca F.C., Alki Larnaca F.C. - 2012-13, 2013–14
 Michael Klukowski - APOEL FC - 2012-13

Finland 

 Tomer Chencinski - Vaasan Palloseura, RoPS, FC Santa Claus - 2011, 2015, 2015
 Mason Trafford - IFK Mariehamn - 2010-12

Germany 
 Alphonso Davies - FC Bayern Munich - 2018–
 Graham Fisher - FC Rot-Weiß Erfurt - 2011-12

Guatemala 

 Andrés Fresenga - C.D. Suchitepéquez - 2017-

Hungary 

 Sherwin Emmanuel - Csákvári TK - 2010
 Manjrekar James - Pécsi MFC, Diósgyőri VTK, Vasas SC - 2014-15, 2015–16, 2016-

Iceland 

 Eiríkur Raphael Elvy

India 

 Sherwin Emmanuel - Southern Samity 
 Iain Hume - ATK, Kerala Blasters - 2015-16, 2017-
 Tony Menezes - Mahindra United - 2006-07
 Imone Mohanta - Churchill Brothers - 2009-10

Israel 

 Anthony Adur - Maccabi Haifa - 2010
 Tomer Chencinski - Maccabi Tel Aviv, Hakoah Amidar Ramat Gan F.C., Hapoel Nir Ramat HaSharon F.C. - 2013-14, 2014, 2014

Lithuania 

 Clarence Warren - FC Džiugas Telšiai
 Andrew Samuels

Luxembourg

 Rick Carreira - Union 05 Kayl-Tétange, CS Muhlenbach Lusitanos - 2012-13, 2013–14

Malaysia 

 Earl Cochrane - Penang FA
 Issey Nakajima-Farran - Terengganu FA - 2015-

Moldova 

 Tomer Chencinski - FC Nistru Otaci - 2008

Mongolia 

 Ryan Fante - Khoromkhon FC, Ulaanbaataryn Unaganuud FC - 2012, 2016

Morocco 

 Reda Agourram - FAR Rabat - 2014

New Zealand 

 Donnie MacGregor - Otago United, Green Island FC, Southern United FC - 2012, 2012–13, 2013

Nicaragua 

 Joshua Lemos - Diriangen FC

Republic of Ireland 

 Graham Fisher - Finn Harps - 2014
 Tomer Chencinski - Shamrock Rovers - 2017-

Romania 

 Jordan de Graaf - CFR Cluj - 2013-14
 Milan Borjan - SC Vaslui - 2012

Serbia 

Milan Beader – Omladinac Novi Banovci (2016–present)
 Milan Borjan – Rad Beograd (2009–2011), Radnički Niš (2014–2015), Red Star (2017–present)
 Milan Božić – Zvezdara (2001–2002,2013–present), Hajduk Beograd (2002–2005), Inđija (2006–2007), Železničar Beograd (2007), Kolubara Lazarevac (2008), FK Beograd (2009–2010), FK Bulbuderac (2012–2013)
 Stefan Cebara – Rad Beograd (2009–2010), Vojvodina (2017–present)
 Derek Cornelius – Javor Ivanjica (2016–present)
 Srdjan Djekanović – Zemun (2001–2003), Zmaj Zemun (2001–2002), Radnički Obrenovac (2003), Železničar Beograd (2003–2004)
 Dejan Jakovic – Red Star Belgrade (2008–2009)
 Milan Janikic – Lokomotiva Beograd (2008–2012) 
 Boban Kajgo – Hajduk Beograd (2007–2011), FK Smederevo (2009–2010), Balkan Bukovica (2012–2013)
 Misel Klisara – Spektrum Novi Sad (2006)
 Steve Knezevic – Budućnost Dobanovci (2016–2017)
 Olivier Lacoste-Lebuis – Mladi Radnik Bačina (2000–2002)
 Jovan Lučić – Rad Beograd (2014), Hajduk Beograd (2015), BSK Batajnica (2015), FK Vršac (2016), Bežanija (2016), Radnički Beograd (2017), Brodarac (2018–present)
 Aleksa Marković – Zemun (2015–2016,2018–present), Radnički Beograd (2016), FK Brodarac (2017), Inđija (2017)
 Mario Ostojić – Milicionar Beograd (1998–1999), Red Star Belgrade (2000–2001)
 Filip Prostran – Mladost Apatin (2009–2010)
 Igor Prostran – Borac Čačak (2002–2004), Remont Čačak (2003)

Singapore 

 Ryan Fante - Sengkang Punggol - 2010
 Sherif El-Masri - Home United FC, Garena Young Lions - 2010-11, 2012–15
 Murphy Wiredu - Sengkang Punggol - 2009-10
 Adrian Butters - Woodlands Wellington FC - 2011
 Anthony Adur - Hougang United FC - 2009
 Jerome Baker - Hougang United FC - 2013-14
 Issey Nakajima-Farran - Albirex Niigata Singapore FC - 2004-06
 Jordan Webb - Hougang United FC, Home United FC, Garena Young Lions, Tampines Rovers FC, Warriors FC - 2010-12, 2013, 2014–16, 2016, 2017-

Sweden 

 Shondell Busby - Juventus IF
 Adrian Butters - Juventus IF
 Tomer Chencinski - Örebro SK, Helsingborgs IF - 2012, 2016

Syria 

 Molham Babouli - Al-Ittihad Aleppo - 2017-

Thailand 

 Anthony Adur - TOT F.C. - 2010-12

Turkey 

 Milan Borjan - Sivasspor - 2011-14
 Atiba Hutchinson - 2014-

Trinidad and Tobago 

 Bradley Beaumont - W Connection F.C. - 2015
 Maleik de Freitas - W Connection F.C. - 2015

Turks and Caicos Islands 

 Ryan Blain - KPMG United FC
 Jason Dulude - KPMG United FC
 Robb Gass - KPMG United FC
 Greg Greatrex - KPMG United FC
 Corey Williams - KPMG United FC

Uruguay 

 Nicolas Galvis - Canadian Soccer Club - 2016
 Victor Gallo - Canadian Soccer Club - 2015-16
 Andrés Fresenga - Canadian Soccer Club, Cerro Largo F.C. - 2016-17, 2017
 Adam Bouchard - Defensor Sporting
 Marco Rodriguez - Defensor Sporting

References

External links
 Canadian players abroad at Soccerway

Canada
Association football player non-biographical articles
Soccer